11th Aerobic Gymnastics World Championships were held in Rodez, France from 15 to 17 June 2010.

Results

Women's Individual

Men's Individual

Mixed Pairs

Trios

Groups

Team

Medal table

References

Official results

World Aerobic Gymnastics Championships
Aerobic Gymnastics World Championships
International gymnastics competitions hosted by France
2010 in French sport